Tides of a Teardrop is the sixth studio album by American band Mandolin Orange. It was released on February 1, 2019 through Yep Roc Records.

Track listing

Charts

References

2019 albums
Yep Roc Records albums
Watchhouse albums